Abi Beyglu (also Romanized as Ābī Beiglū; also known as Āb-e Beiglū and Ābeyglū) is a city in Vilkij District of Namin County, Ardabil province, Iran. At the 2006 census, its population was 5,242 in 1,090 households. The following census in 2011 counted 5,999 people in 1,435 households. The latest census in 2016 showed a population of 6,516 people in 1,769 households.

References 

Namin County

Cities in Ardabil Province

Towns and villages in Namin County

Populated places in Ardabil Province

Populated places in Namin County